The Palacio de los Condes del Vado y de Guenduláin is a palace located in the city of Toledo, in Castile-La Mancha, Spain.

References

Palaces in Toledo, Spain